The Hungarian House of New York, founded in 1966, serves Hungarian communities of New York City as an independent cultural institution. It is located at 213 E 82nd St, New York City in the Upper East Side. It hosts and organises weekly as well as single events, and gives place to a Hungarian library and to the János Arany Hungarian School.

The history and role of the Hungarian House of New York 
Five members of the Hungarian community – Peter Schell, Ede Neuman de Végvár, Károly Pulvári, Ferenc Chorin and Tibor Eckhardt, operating within the framework of the Széchenyi István Society, the Hungarian Catholic League, and the American Hungarian Library and Historical Society – established the American Foundation for Hungarian Literature and Education (AFHLE) on August 23, 1963, which was officially registered as a non-profit organization by the State of New York on April 16, 1964.

With the generous support of their founding members, the three organizations purchased the building of the future Hungarian House from the German athletic club Central Turnverein of the City of New York at 213-215 East 82nd Street on September 9, 1966, when the AFHLE assumed responsibility for its maintenance. Over the years, the Catholic League handed over its ownership rights to local Hungarian Franciscans, who in turn passed it on to the Hungarian Scout Association in Exteris, which has been the third co-owner organization ever since.

So today  the Hungarian House of New York is owned by three non-profit organizations: the American Hungarian Library and Historical Society,  the Hungarian Scout Association in Exteris, and the Széchenyi István Society.

The founders of the Hungarian House made sure the House would always stay in the hands of the Hungarian community. According to the Articles of Incorporation, the co-owners can only pass on ownership rights to organizations with similar objectives, and strictly with the consent of the other two co-owners. Furthermore, in the event the AFHLE were to be dissolved and the Hungarian House sold, none of the co-owners shall benefit from the proceeds, and the entire amount is to be offered to organizations engaged in Hungarian scientific and cultural activities.

As one of the central community establishments of Hungarian immigrants in New York, the Hungarian House has welcomed numerous leading personalities over the years. It was among these walls that József Antall, the first democratically elected Prime Minister of Hungary after the fall of Communism in 1989, greeted the Hungarian-American community, as did Presidents Árpád Göncz and Pál Schmitt, Cardinal József Mindszenty Prince Primate of Hungary, Member of the European Parliament Otto von Habsburg, nuclear physicist Edward Teller, Nobel laureate physicist Dennis Gábor, Cardinal Péter Erdő Primate of Hungary, and  László Kövér President of the Hungarian Parliament.

From the very beginning, thanks to the work of hundreds of generous supporters and volunteers, thousands of visitors could learn about slices of Hungarian culture in the Hungarian House. Numerous lectures, concerts, film screenings, productions, folk dances, exhibitions, fairs, dinners, gatherings, Hungarian and English language classes took place in these halls, all of them serving both the Hungarian émigrés and the host country. Between 1974 and 1975, 24 Hungarian organizations utilized the Hungarian House, according to the minutes of the AFHLE.

External links 
 The website of the Hungarian House of New York
 The Facebook-page of the Hungarian House of New York
 The website of the Hungarian Scout Association in Exteris  (Hungarian)
 The website of the Széchenyi István Society 
 The website of the American Hungarian Library and Historical Society
 The website of the János Arany Hungarian School

Organizations based in New York City